This is a chronological timeline of events that are centered around the politics of Nepal after its unification by Prithvi Narayan Shah.

After unification: 1769–1902

Rana regime: 1846–1951

Transitional phase: 1951–1960

Panchayat system: 1960–1990

Constitutional monarchy: 1990–2008

Federal republic: 2008–present

References 

Politics of Nepal
History of Nepal
Nepal